Ash Valley is an unincorporated community in Pawnee County, Kansas, United States.

History
A post office in Ash Valley once opened in 1877, closed in 1908, reopened in 1922, and closed permanently in 1941.

Education
The community is served by Fort Larned USD 495 public school district.

References

Further reading

External links
 Pawnee County maps: Current, Historic, KDOT

Unincorporated communities in Pawnee County, Kansas
Unincorporated communities in Kansas